Compagnie de Navigation Sud-Atlantique was a French shipping company prominent in the South American routes.

Founding

In July 1912 a new convention was entered into between the French government and the Societe d'Etudes de navigation, a nominal concessionaire, which ceded its rights to the Compagnie de Navigation Sud-Atlantique. Messageries Maritimes, had held the contracts for the South American routes since 1860, but had done very little since 1904 to improve their South American service regarding it as not particularly profitable, though the speed of Messageries ships was also an issue.

The contract, signed on 11 July 1911, was for 25 years beginning 22 July 1912 and provided for a subsidised postal service, with round=trip voyages every two weeks between Bordeaux, Lisbon, Dakar, Rio de Janeiro, Montevideo and Buenos Aires.

In addition the company was required to operate a non-subsidised commercial service with voyages at least once per month between Bordeaux, Dakar, Pernambuco, Bahia, Rio de Janeiro, Santos, Montevideo and Buenos Aires by vessels of not less than 4,000 tons cargo capacity and not less than 11 knots average speed.

The Compagnie de Navigation Sud-Atlantique was launched in early 1912, its capital being 15 million francs (£600,000).

Fleet
As a precondition (art.26) for the subsidised contract and to ensure that sufficient ships were in service to provide a reliable mail service, the company was required to build, in France, four passenger liners of a minimum displacement of 11,000 tonnes, able to maintain a minimum speed of 15 knots between Bordeaux and Lisbon, and 18 knots between Lisbon and Buenos Aires. with a minimum length of 175 metres and provide six paquebots mixtes (passenger freighters).

The new company placed orders for new ships, with the Chantiers de l'Atlantique at St. Nazaire for the SS Lutetia (14,000 tons) and with Forges & Chantiers de la Mediterranee at La Seyne for a similar ship, the SS Gallia, both to be delivered in 1913. The third ship was the SS Massilia, also built at La Seyne and launched in 1914, but not completed until 1920.  The Gallia was able to make the passage from Bordeaux to Buenos Aires in 15 days.

To achieve the promised service levels, (while the new-builds were advancing) the agreement (art.97) allowed that, temporarily, the company might operate vessels of 9,000 tons displacement at a speed of 14 knots from Buenos Aires to Lisbon and 15 knots from Lisbon to Buenos Aires and two of the vessels might be of foreign construction.

Thus a number of second-hand ships had to be acquired in order inaugurate the service. These included the "Avondale Castle" launched in 1897 (from the Union-Castle Line) and the quite aged La Bretagne and La Gascogne, which had been built as far back as 1886. These latter two were transferred from the Compagnie Générale Transatlantique. The long-moribund (and extremely troublesome) Kaiser Friedrich was added to the fleet, and renamed the Burdigala) but swiftly proved less useful than hoped.

Early on in the new company's existence a decision was made to paint the line's vessels in white. Therefore, in the second half of the year 1913 all vessels were painted in this way.

The company also had the practice of giving its ships the Latin variations of French names. For example, Lutetia=Paris, Massilia=Marseille, Gallia=Gaul, Burdigala=Bordeaux.

Due to the conditions created in the First World War, the 1912 was revised and renewed for a period of 10 years from the 13th of August 1920.

The Gallia was lost in the First World War (with substantial loss of life) while serving as a troopship. The Burdigala was also lost on troopship duties in Greek waters. The required fourth ship of series was never built. The Massilia joined the Lutetia as "running mates" in the post-war period. The next major addition was the iconic L'Atlantique (with nearly 41,000 tonnes) in 1930 but its working life proved to be short, being destroyed by fire while sailing from Bordeaux to Le Havre in 1933. This necessitated the scrapping of the vessel. In 1939 the Pasteur (at 29,000 tonnes – reflecting lowered demand on the route) was added to the fleet.

The Massilia might be called "the ship of exile" in its latter days. In 1939, on its voyage from La Rochelle, leaving 19 October 1939 and arriving Buenos Aires 5 November 1939, the ship was painted camouflage grey to dodge German submarines which were already on the prowl. It carried on board 384 passengers fleeing Europe, of which the largest contingent were Spanish republicans who had previously taken refuge in France. Amongst this group were many artists, journalists, writers, academics and theatre figures.  
 
It also played a starring role in June 1940, carrying a large number of prominent politicians, including 27 of the Vichy 80, fleeing France to North Africa after the surrender of the country to the Nazi invaders and the assumption of the Vichy government.

The company was said to have ships that were ill-fated, undoubtedly true for the Gallia, L'Atlantique and Burdigala, but clearly not true for the long-service lives of the Lutetia, Pasteur and Massilia.

Change of control
In 1914, the company was placed under the control of the Compagnie Générale Transatlantique and was taken over in 1916 by the Compagnie Maritime des Chargeurs Réunis. In 1928 Chargeurs Réunis took over Sud Atlantique's intermediate service.

The Compagnie des Messageries Maritimes then took over the South American service in 1962, with the only three passenger ships still left, i.e. the 1951 built MS Laennec, Louis Lumière and Charles Tellier, nicknamed 'les savants' (the scientists). This ended the Compagnie de Navigation Sud-Atlantique as a brand name. Messageries Maritimes continued the operation of these vessels on this South American service until 1966, at which time
they were sold, and the service was then performed by the brand new mv Pasteur.

Ships of the Compagnie de Navigation Sud-Atlantique

Fleet

References

Further reading
 Great Passenger Ships of the World. Volumes 1 to 6. Kludas, Arnold, Published by Cambridge: Patrick Stephens −1987 (1977), 
 Harris, CJ; Ingpen, Brian D (1994). Mailships of the Union-Castle Line. Vlaeberg: Fernwood Press. .

Ocean liners
Passenger ships of France
Ships of the Compagnie Générale Transatlantique
Ships of the Compagnie de Navigation Sud-Atlantique